List of Fletcher-class destroyers and their dispositions. There were 175 of them built during World War II.

Ships in class

References 

Fletcher-class destroyers at Destroyer History Foundation

 

Fletcher-class destroyers
Fletcher
Fletcher